The list of shipwrecks in 1811 includes ships sunk, wrecked or otherwise lost during 1811.

January

1 January

2 January

3 January

4 January

5 January

6 January

9 January

10 January

11 January

12 January

13 January

15 January

16 January

17 January

18 January

19 January

20 January

21 January

23 January

24 January

25 January

26 January

28 January

29 January

30 January

31 January

Unknown date

February

1 February

2 February

3 February

4 February

5 February

6 February

7 February

8 February

9 February

11 February

13 February

14 February

15 February

16 February

17 February

18 February

20 February

21 February

22 February

23 February

24 February

25 February

26 February

27 February

28 February

Unknown date

March

1 March

2 March

3 March

4 March

5 March

6 March

7 March

8 March

9 March

10 March

11 March

12 March

13 March

23 March

24 March

27 March

28 March

29 March

31 March

Unknown date

April

6 April

9 April

12 April

13 April

14 April

15 April

16 April

17 April

18 April

19 April

20 April

24 April

25 April

26 April

29 April

30 April

Unknown date

May

1 May

2 May

5 May

7 May

9 May

14 May

16 May

17 May

19 May

20 May

21 May

23 May

24 May

26 May

27 May

29 May

Unknown date

June

2 June

4 June

5 June

10 June

14 June

16 June

29 June

30 June

Unknown date

July

5 July

6 July

7 July

10 July

11 July

12 July

14 July

17 July

19 July

21 July

22 July

28 July

29 July

Unknown date

August

3 August

4 August

6 August

7 August

9 August

10 August

11 August

16 August

18 August

21 August

23 August

26 August

27 August

Unknown date

September

1 September

2 September

5 September

8 September

15 September

18 September

19 September

20 September

21 September

23 September

24 September

25 September

26 September

27 September

28 September

30 September

Unknown date

October

1 October

2 October

4 October

5 October

6 October

7 October

8 October

9 October

10 October

11 October

12 October

13 October

14 October

15 October

17 October

20 October

21 October

22 October

23 October

24 October

25 October

26 October

27 October

28 October

29 October

30 October

31 October

Unknown date

November

1 November

2 November

3 November

4 November

5 November

6 November

7 November

8 November

11 November

14 November

15 November

16 November

17 November

18 November

19 November

21 November

22 November

24 November

27 November

28 November

30 November

Unknown date

December

1 December

2 December

3 December

4 December

5 December

6 December

7 December

8 December

9 December

10 December

11 December

13 December

14 December

15 December

16 December

17 December

18 December

19 December

21 December

22 December

23 December

24 December

25 December

27 December

28 December

29 December

Unknown date

Unknown date

References 

1811